A magnetic field is the physical phenomenon produced by moving electric charges and exhibited by ferrous materials.

Magnetic field or magnetic fields may also refer to:

Science
 The magnetosphere, or magnetic field of a celestial body
 Earth's magnetic field
 Magnetic field of Mars
 A stellar magnetic field
 A magnetic field viewing film

Other
 Les Champs Magnétiques (English title: The Magnetic Fields), a 1920 surrealist novel by André Breton
 Les Chants Magnétiques (English title: Magnetic Fields, literally Magnetic Songs), a 1981 album by Jean-Michel Jarre
 The Magnetic Fields, an American indie pop band
 Magnetic Fields (video game developer), a British computer game developer